Silvia Weiss is a German operatic and concert soprano.

Life 
Weiss was born in Wiesbaden where her musical talent was already noticed during her school days. Very soon she sang in the children and youth choir of the Hessisches Staatstheater Wiesbaden, had her first performances there and in Kurhaus concerts. After graduating from high school, she began studying singing at the Berlin University of the Arts with Donald Grobe. There, she was also in Aribert Reimann's Lied class, which had a decisive influence on contemporary music. While still a student, she made her debut at the Berliner Kammeroper as Elisabeth Zimmer in Hans Werner Henze's Elegy for Young Lovers and in baroque operas by Reinhard Keiser and Francesco Cavalli, and soon sang in a production at the  Sophie Scholl in Udo Zimmermann's Weiße Rose and was a finalist and scholarship holder of the VDMK Federal Singing Competition. She received further artistic supervision from Irmgard Hartmann-Dressler and Ileana Cotrubaș (Vienna Master Classes), Josef Metternich (Münchner Singschul'), Klesie Kelly (International Bach Academy Stuttgart) and Reri Grist (Hamburg).

After her studies, she initially concentrated on concert singing and had success in Europe, Russia and the US. She has sung an extensive repertoire through almost all epochs and styles, working with renowned concert choirs and orchestras such as the Berlin Philharmonic under the direction of Nikolaus Harnoncourt, the Deutsches Symphonie-Orchester and the Dresdner Philharmonie under Marek Janowski, the Munich Radio Orchestra under Jun Märkl, the Rundfunk-Sinfonieorchester Berlin under Jahja Ling, the International Bach Academy under Helmuth Rilling, the Thomanerchor Leipzig, the Berlin and Munich Radio Choirs. Important points were : The Seasons by Joseph Haydn with the Berlin Konzerthaus Orchestra under Michael Gielen and Die Auferstehung und Himmelfahrt Jesu with the Mozarteum Orchestra Salzburg under Ivor Bolton and regularly the concerts with the Dresdner Kreuzchor under Roderich Kreile (Christmas Oratorio by J. S. Bach, the Requiem by Gabriel Fauré). Weiss also devoted herself to chamber music, with baroque ensembles such as the Schuppanzigh Quartet, the Concerto Köln, the Akademie für Alte Musik Berlin and contemporary ensembles such as the Sharoun Ensemble, the Ensemble Neue Musik Berlin, the Ensemble Avantgarde Leipzig, the Musica Viva Dresden.

With the role of Donna Elvira in Mozart's Don Giovanni in the first opera production by Katharina Thalbach in 1997 her actual opera career began. Shortly afterwards she sang the title role in Lucia di Lammermoor in Honduras and in 1999 she appeared at the Deutsche Oper Berlin in Götz Friedrich's production of Moses und Aron by Arnold Schönberg under the musical direction of Christian Thielemann. Engagements at the  followed (Romilda in Handel's Serse under the direction of Michael Helmrath) and at the Vienna Schauspielhaus (Tisbe in Johann Adolf Hasse's Piramo e Tisbe with the Vienna Academy under Simon Schouten) and in 2002 at the Théatre de la Monnaie in Brussels in the world premiere of Luca Francesconi's Ballata (musical direction was by Kasushi Ono, directed by Achim Freyer). A central role was played by Konstanze from Mozart's The Abduction from the Seraglio, which she sang in many productions, for example in the new production at the Wuppertaler Bühnen under Enrico Delamboye, directed by Johannes Weigand, at the Staatstheater Wiesbaden, at the Mainfranken Theater Würzburg in 2004 Würzburg, to name but a few. Other important leading roles are Gilda in Rigoletto and Violetta in La traviata by Giuseppe Verdi. With the part of Cyane in Proserpin by Joseph Martin Kraus (musical direction: Christoph Spering, director: Georges Delnon) she again proved her affinity for the classical baroque at the Schwetzinger Festspiele in 2006, but was then able to demonstrate her talent at the Théâtre du Capitole in the same year in Die Frau ohne Schatten under Pinchas Steinberg (director: Nicolas Joel) as the voice of the falcon and guardian of the threshold also emphasize her suitability for Richard Strauss. This was followed by a re-invitation for a recital (Midi du Capitole) and as Käthe in the world premiere of Faust by Philippe Fénelon under Bernhard Kontarsky.. At the end of 2007, she made her debut at the Teatro San Carlo in Naples as the 1st Squire and Flower Girl in Richard Wagner's Parsifal under Asher Fisch (director: Federico Tiezzi) and in 2008 she performed a Mozart part again, namely Pamina in The Magic Flute at the Dresdner Staatsoperette.

Festivals 
Weiss was and is guest at the following festivals:

The Salzburg Easter Festival, the Biennale di Venezia, the Varazdiner Barockabende, the Dresdner Musikfestspiele, the Berliner Festwochen, the Biennale Alter Musik Berlin, the Graz Styriarte, the Ultraschallfestival Berlin, the Klassikfestival Ruhr, the Potsdamer Schlossfestspiele, the Ludwigsburger Schlossfestspiele, the Schwetzinger Festspiele.

Recordings 
 Hans Werner Henze: Elegie für junge Liebende, 1995 Deutsche Schallplatten Berlin
 Ernst Krenek: Das geheime Königreich, 2004 Capriccio
 Ernst Toch: Die Prinzessin auf der Erbse, 2007 Capriccio

References

External links 
 
 

German operatic sopranos
Year of birth missing (living people)
Living people
People from Wiesbaden